The 1956 Women's Western Open was contested from June 28 to July 1 at Wakonda Country Club. It was the 27th edition of the Women's Western Open.

This event was won by Beverly Hanson.

Final leaderboard

External links
St. Joseph Gazette source
Sarasota Herald-Tribune source

Women's Western Open
Golf in Iowa
Women's Western Open
Women's Western Open
Women's Western Open
Women's Western Open
Women's Western Open
Women's sports in Iowa